The MGB, an initialism for Ministerstvo gosudarstvennoy bezopasnosti SSSR (translated in English as Ministry for State Security), was the name of the Soviet state security  apparatus dealing with internal and external  security issues: secret police duties, foreign and domestic  intelligence and counterintelligence, etc. from 1946 to 1953.

Origins of the MGB
The MGB was just one of many incarnations of the Soviet State Security apparatus. After the revolution, the Bolsheviks relied on a strong political police or security force to support and control their regime. During the Russian Civil War, the Cheka were in power, relinquishing it to State Political Directorate (GPU) in 1922 after the fighting was over. 

The GPU was then renamed The People's Commissariat for Internal Affairs (NKVD) in 1934. From the mid-1930s and until the creation of the KGB, this "Organ of State Security" was re-organized and renamed multiple times. In 1941, the state-security function was separated from the NKVD and became the People's Commissariat for State Security (NKGB), only to be reintegrated a few months later during the Nazi invasion of the Soviet Union. 

In 1943, the NKGB was once again made into an independent organization in response to the Soviet occupation of parts of Eastern Europe. SMERSH—anecdotally derived from a phrase translated as "Death to Spies"—was designed to be a counter-intelligence unit within the Red Army to ensure the loyalty of the army personnel.  

Following the end of the war, both the NKVD and the NKGB were converted to ministries and redubbed the Ministry for Internal Affairs (MVD) and the Ministry for State Security (MGB).  The MGB and MVD merged again in 1953, orchestrated by Lavrenty Beria, who was then arrested and executed. The KGB took on the mantle of the NKGB/ MGB and, in 1954, broke off from the reformed MVD.

Functions of the MGB
The MGB essentially inherited the "secret police" function of the old NKVD, conducting espionage and counterespionage, as well as enacting a policy of supervision and surveillance to keep control and to prevent disloyalty. After World War II, the MGB was used to bring the newly acquired Eastern Bloc under Soviet control.  It enforced rigid conformity in the satellite states of Eastern Europe and infiltrated and destroyed anticommunist, anti-Soviet, or independent groups.

The protection, policing, and supervision of the Soviet Union fell to this new agency, as it was the main agency responsible for the security of the Union. The MGB directed espionage networks at home and abroad, and also organized both domestic and foreign counterintelligence. They were also responsible for enforcing security regulations, monitoring and censoring information leaving or coming into the country; and supervising the vast majority of Soviet life, including the planting and organizing of agents to track and monitor public opinion and loyalty; as well as ensuring the safety of important government and party officials.

The MGB, above all else, was a security organization, and as such, was designed for covert and clandestine surveillance and supervision.  The intelligence apparatus was able to permeate every level and branch of state administration, with agents planted in collective farms, factories, and local governments, as well as throughout the upper level and rank and file of Soviet bureaucracy. Each department within the government also had their own official supervisor, a "Special Section" staffed by the MGB to keep tabs on and regulate the employees, and to ensure the absence of disloyalty.

The Ministry retained a high level of autonomy and a remarkable amount of freedom of operation within the Soviet system, as the agency was only responsible to the Central Committee. MGB agents had the power to arrest and sentence opponents upon receiving approval from a higher authority, a clause oft ignored.  The OSO (the Special Council of the State Security Ministry) convicted arrestees charged with committing political crimes, including espionage, and could banish them from certain areas, or from the USSR entirely. 

In Stalin’s last years, between  1945 and 1953, more than 750,000 Soviet citizens were arrested and punished. Many of the arrests made by the MGB were founded on flimsy or fabricated evidence, most notably on the "suspicion of espionage" (podozreniye shpionazha, or PSh). Since in many cases it is impossible to prove any espionage activities or even an intention to spy, the case is built on the "suspicion of espionage", making acquittal impossible.

Structure
The general structure of the MGB is much the same as both the organization it came from, the NKGB, and the organization that followed, the KGB

The MGB was composed of several departments or directorates with a specific purpose within the organization.

Major Departments

First Main Directorate
First Main Directorate was responsible for foreign intelligence.  The First Main Directorate  maintained surveillance over the "Soviet colony" (SK—Sovetskaya koloniya), i.e., the personnel of Soviet diplomatic, trade, technical, cultural, and other agencies functioning abroad. It also sought to infiltrate foreign governmental bodies, businesses, public organizations, sensitive industrial plants, cultural and educational institutions, etc., placing MGB agents in strategic posts for intelligence-gathering and possible covert action.

In 1947 the GRU (military intelligence) and MGB's 1st Main Directorate were combined into the recently created foreign intelligence agency, the Committee of Information (KI), under the control of Vyacheslav Molotov, in an attempt to streamline the intelligence needs of the State.  In 1948, the military personnel in KI were returned to the GRU. KI sections dealing with the new East Bloc and Soviet émigrés were returned to the MGB later that year. In 1951, the KI returned to the MGB, as a First Main Directorate of the Ministry of State Security.

Second and Third Main Directorates
The Second Main Directorate focused on domestic counterintelligence and acted as an internal security and political police force. The goal of this department was to combat foreign intelligence operations within the USSR and its territories. The Second Directorate worked mainly inside the country to combat foreign espionage and to study the forms and methods used by foreign intelligence services on the territory of the U.S.S.R.  The work it did abroad aimed to organize operational-technical intelligence, i.e., the investigation of the forms, working methods and regulations of the intelligence, counterintelligence, and police and administrative organs of foreign countries.

The Third Main Directorate was concerned with military counterintelligence. It carried out many of the same tasks as SMERSH, which it absorbed, as it conducted political surveillance of armed forces.  It relied heavily on the Army Special Section to ensure the loyalties of the soldiers and officers.  The MGB operatives were used to supervise personnel and daily action, as well as to carry out counterintelligence operations.

The Fifth Main Directorate
The Fifth Main Directorate evolved out of the Main Secret Political Administration. It was responsible for regulating and repressing real or imagined dissent within the party apparatus and Soviet society.  This involved supervising almost every aspect of Soviet life, including the intelligentsia, bureaucracy, general administrative agencies, cultural organizations, educational institutions, and even the party apparatus itself. They investigated the political reliability of the entire population of the Soviet Union, with particular attention to the Party and Soviet apparatus, up to the highest leaders of the Party and government.

They secretly supervised the activity of the entire administrative and economic apparatus of the state and all scientific, public, church, and other organizations.  The goal was to hunt down "deviations from the general line," "opposition leanings" within the party to ferret out and eliminate "bourgeois nationalism"  in the Soviet satellites, i.e., anti-Soviet movements under the guise of nationalism.

Minor Departments

the Fourth Directorate
At the beginning of the MGB, the Fourth Directorate was designed as a proto-terrorist force to combat the anti-Soviet underground, nationalist formations, and hostile elements. Viktor Abakumov dissolved this department in 1946, but kept the main players in a Special Service group so that they could continue with the same pattern of violence that the Fourth Directorate was known for. The group was dissolved in 1949. 

Upon the destruction of the Fourth Directorate as a terrorist group, the department was transitioned into Transportation Security. It was responsible for the preparation and security of mobilization and transport. The department was responsible for counterintelligence and surveillance operations within their transport programs.

The Sixth Directorate
This department was a short-lived organization designed to collect and process Signals Intelligence, or SIGINT. The department was initially composed of the NKGB's 5th Directorate (responsible for wartime communications) and an independent cryptography department, the 2nd Special Department.  However, this Directorate was competing with another better-funded communications organization, Department ‘R’, which specialized in radio counterintelligence. The 6th Directorate was dissolved in 1949, and its resources and personnel absorbed into the Special Services Department (GUSS), a cryptanalysis and information security branch of the Central Committee.

Economic Administration
Known as the ‘K’ Division, this organization supervised the economy and ran economic counterintelligence and industrial security.  They were concerned with the implementation of security programs and requirements, as well as the supervision and monitoring of the workers, leading them to make extensive use of the Special Sections within the state and local organizations.

The Second Special Administration
Sometimes called the Seventh Directorate, this section was responsible for providing the tools, techniques, and manpower to accommodate the physical surveillance needs of the MGB. They offered facilities, devices, and methodology to help with the demands of the intelligence departments. They were able to do both outdoor (tailing) and photographic surveillance, as well as being able to tap phone lines, monitor conversations in other rooms through hidden microphones and covertly examining mail. They also had sections devoted to codes, cryptography, and ciphers.

The Division for the Protection of Leaders
Otherwise known as the Guards Directorate, they were charged with the personal security of the top party officials. The Division provided personal security to members and alternates of the Presidium of the Central Committee, ministers of the U.S.S.R. and their deputies, secretaries of the Central Committee, and a number of high officeholders specifically listed. The Division was also responsible for guarding important agencies and installations of the secret police themselves.

A number of the top officials from this department were implicated in the Doctors' Plot, showing the inherent mistrust and suspicion within the Soviet security apparatus.

List of ministers
Viktor Abakumov (18 October 1946 – 14 July 1951)
Sergei Ogoltsov (14 July 1951 – 9 August 1951) (acting)
Semyon Ignatyev (9 August 1951 – 5 March 1953)

Major campaigns

Doctors' Plot
Leningrad Affair
Mingrelian Affair
Night of the Murdered Poets
Operation North

Intelligence operations
 Red Orchestra (spy)
 Cambridge Five

In popular culture
In Tom Rob Smith's novel Child 44, the first in the Leo Demidov trilogy, Demidov is an MGB agent

See also
Eastern Bloc politics
Stasi

References

Further reading
See also: 
 

Law enforcement agencies of the Soviet Union
Soviet intelligence agencies
Defunct law enforcement agencies of Russia
State Security
Eastern Bloc
Law enforcement in communist states
Political repression in the Soviet Union
Secret police
1946 establishments in Russia
1946 establishments in the Soviet Union
1953 disestablishments in the Soviet Union
Government agencies established in 1946
Government agencies disestablished in 1953
Intelligence ministries